The Much Wenlock and Severn Junction Railway was a railway in Shropshire, England, established by the Much Wenlock and Severn Railway Company. The company itself was formed on 21 July 1859. The railway was later constructed between 1860 and 1862 forming part of the Wellington to Craven Arms Railway. For much of its working life, the railway was operated by the Great Western Railway and subsequently the Western Region of British Railways.

References

External links
 The National Archives: Much Wenlock & Severn Junction Railway Co

Early British railway companies
Railway lines opened in 1862
Closed railway lines in the West Midlands (region)
1862 establishments in England